Calyx is a term used in animal anatomy for some cuplike areas or structures.

Etymology
Latin, from calyx (from Ancient Greek κάλυξ, case of a bud, husk").

Cnidarians
The spicules containing the basal portion of the upper tentacular part of the polyp of some soft corals (also called calice).

Entoprocta
A body part of the  Entoprocta from which tentacles arise and the mouth and anus are located.

Echinoderms
The body disk that is covered with a leathery tegumen containing calcareous plates (in crinoids and ophiuroids the main part of the body where the viscera are located).

Humans

Either a minor calyx in the kidney, a conglomeration of two or three minor calyces to form a major calyx, or the Calyx of Held, a particularly large synapse in the mammalian auditory central nervous system, named by H. Held in his 1893 article Die centrale Gehörleitung, due to its flower-petal-like shape.

Insects
In male insects, a funnel-shaped expansion of the basal part of the vas deferens (part of the seminal duct). Also in entomology, a flattened cap of neuropile in an insect brain (a component of the corpus pedunculatum) and by certain female insects, an expansion of the oviduct into which the ovarioles open.

References

Cnidarian anatomy
Echinoderm anatomy
Insect anatomy